Getik is a village in the Chambarak Municipality of the Gegharkunik Province of Armenia.

History 
The village was founded in 1922 by settlers from Artsvashen and has megalithic monuments, khachkars and an Iron Age cyclopean fort by the name of "Mughani Khach".

Gallery

References

External links 

 

Populated places in Gegharkunik Province
Populated places established in 1922